Mark Henry Ashcraft (born December 8, 1949) is an American academic and the chair of the Department of Psychology at the University of Nevada Las Vegas.  He received his PhD in cognitive psychology from the University of Kansas in 1975.  He has published multiple books and articles on cognitive psychology, including:

 Human Memory and Cognition. Prentice Hall (1997) .
 Cognition. Prentice Hall; 4th ed. (2005) .

References

1949 births
Living people
People from Louisville, Kentucky
University of Kansas alumni
University of Nevada, Las Vegas faculty
21st-century American psychologists
20th-century American psychologists